The Hôtel de Ville de Lyon is the city hall of the City of Lyon and one of the largest historic buildings in the city, located between the Place des Terreaux and the Place de la Comédie, in front of the Opera Nouvel. Built in the late 17th century, the building has been classified as a Monument historique since 12 July 1886. As part of the Presqu'île district, the building was inscribed on the UNESCO World Heritage List alongside other districts in the centre of Lyon, bearing testimony to Lyon's long history as an important European city.

History
 In the 17th century, Lyon was developed and the Presqu'île became the city center with the place of Terreaux, and the Lyon City Hall was built between 1645 and 1651 by Simon Maupin.
 Following a fire in 1674, the building was restored and modified, including its facade, designed by Jules Hardouin-Mansart and his pupil Robert de Cotte.
 In 1792 during the French Revolution, the half-relief of Louis XIV on horseback, in the middle of the facade was removed and replaced only during the Restoration by Henry IV of France, in the same posture.

Gallery

References

External links
 Views of the Lyon City Hall
 Official site
 History of the Lyon City Hall

1st arrondissement of Lyon
Buildings and structures in Lyon
City and town halls in France
1651 establishments in France
Tourist attractions in Lyon
Buildings and structures completed in 1651